New Deal is a census-designated place and unincorporated community in Sumner County, Tennessee, United States. Its population was 368 as of the 2010 census.

Demographics

Education
Oakmont Elementary School is located in New Deal.

References

Census-designated places in Sumner County, Tennessee
Census-designated places in Tennessee
Unincorporated communities in Tennessee